The 2015–16 season was Wigan Athletic's 84th year in existence and their first back in League One, since the 2002–03 season, after being relegated the previous season. Along with competing in League One, the club also participated in the FA Cup, League Cup and Football League Trophy. The season covers the period from 1 July 2015 to 30 June 2016.

First team squad
As of 13 August 2015

Transfers

Transfers in

Total spending:  £1,050,000

Transfers out

Total incoming: £1,500,000

Loans in

Loans out

Squad statistics

Appearances

Top scorers

Disciplinary record

Includes all competitive matches.

Last updated 8 May 2016

Competitions

Pre-season friendlies
On 15 May 2015, it was announced that Wigan Athletic would face Altrincham, Southport, Partick Thistle, Dundee and Blackburn Rovers as part of their pre-season schedule.

League One

League table

Results by matchday

Matches
On 17 June 2015, the fixtures for the forthcoming season were announced.

League Cup
On 16 June 2015, the first round draw was made, Wigan Athletic were drawn at home against Bury.

Football League Trophy
On 5 September 2015, the second round draw was shown live on Soccer AM and drawn by Charlie Austin and Ed Skrein. Wigan will go to Crewe Alexandra.

FA Cup

The First Round draw took place on 26 October at 7pm, drawing Wigan away to Bury, this game will take place on the 7 November.

Lancashire Senior Cup
On the Lancashire FA website the first round details were announced, Wigan Athletic will face Bolton Wanderers.

Overall summary

Season summary

Score overview

References

Wigan Athletic
Wigan Athletic F.C. seasons